English Rugby Union Midland Division - Midlands 5 West (SE) is an English Rugby Union League.

Midlands 6 West (SW) is made up of teams from around the East Midlands of England who play home and away matches throughout a winter season. As with many low level they are often subject to re-structure.

Promoted teams move up to Midlands 5 West (South).

Teams 2008-2009

Alcester RUFC
Atherstone RUFC 
Coventry Saracens RUFC
Coventry Technical RUFC 
Old Wheatleyans RUFC 
Rugby Welsh RUFC
Trinity Guild RUFC
Warwickian RUFC
Wellesbourne RUFC

Teams 2007-2008

Atherstone RUFC
Coventrians RUFC
Coventry Saracens RUFC
Coventry Technical RUFC 
Old Wheatleyans RUFC 
Rugby Welsh RUFC
Standard RUFC
Stoke Old Boys RUFC
Trinity Guild RUFC

See also

 English rugby union system

7